Mongolia competed at the 2004 Summer Olympics in Athens, Greece, from 13 to 29 August 2004. This was the nation's tenth appearance at the Olympics, except the 1984 Summer Olympics in Los Angeles, because of its partial support to the Soviet boycott.

The Mongolian National Olympic Committee sent a total of 20 athletes, 13 men and 7 women, to compete in 7 different sports, tying its delegation count with Sydney four years earlier. In the wake of Munkhbayar Dorjsuren's transfer to the German team, three Mongolian athletes had previously competed in Sydney, including shooter Otryadyn Gündegmaa in the women's pistol events. Judoka and world champion Damdinsürengiin Nyamkhüü was appointed by the committee to become Mongolia's flag bearer in the opening ceremony, dressed in a traditional costume.

After failing to achieve a single Olympic medal from Sydney, Mongolia left Athens with only a bronze from twenty-year-old judoka Khashbaataryn Tsagaanbaatar on the first day of the Games.

Medalists

Athletics

Mongolian athletes have so far achieved qualifying standards in the following athletics events (up to a maximum of 3 athletes in each event at the 'A' Standard, and 1 at the 'B' Standard).

 Key
 Note – Ranks given for track events are within the athlete's heat only
 Q = Qualified for the next round
 q = Qualified for the next round as a fastest loser or, in field events, by position without achieving the qualifying target
 NR = National record
 N/A = Round not applicable for the event
 Bye = Athlete not required to compete in round

Men

Women

Boxing

Mongolia sent one lightweight boxer to the 2004 Olympics.

Judo

Eight Mongolian judoka (six men and two women) qualified for the 2004 Summer Olympics, its largest contingent in any sport, and it was rewarded with its only medal of the Games. Khashbaataryn Tsagaanbaatar won his first three matches in less than five minutes, progressing to the semifinals, where he lasted less than thirty seconds against his Japanese opponent. In the bronze medal match, there were no scores in the five-minute period, so another period was played, and Tsagaanbaatar scored with less than a minute-and-a-half remaining to win the bronze.

Men

Women

Shooting 

One Mongolian shooter qualified to compete in the following events:

Women

Swimming

Men

Weightlifting 

Mongolia has qualified a single weightlifter.

Wrestling 

 Key
  – Victory by Fall.
  - Decision by Points - the loser with technical points.
  - Decision by Points - the loser without technical points.

Men's freestyle

Women's freestyle

See also
 Mongolia at the 2002 Asian Games
 Mongolia at the 2004 Summer Paralympics

References

External links
Official Report of the XXVIII Olympiad
Mongolian National Olympic Committee 

Nations at the 2004 Summer Olympics
2004
2004 in Mongolian sport